Starways was a British airline which operated from 1948 until 1963. The company offered freight transport, passenger charter services and serviced internal and international scheduled routes.

History

The airline was formed at Blackpool in 1948 by two pilots, Noel Rodnight and Albert Dean, to operate a charter service using a Percival Petrel for celebrities appearing in the Blackpool shows. The company started operations from Blackpool Airport in January 1949 with the Petrel. In May 1950 the Petrel was destroyed in an accident and replaced with an Avro Anson. In 1950 the business was relocated to Liverpool (Speke) Airport and F.H.Wilson & J.A.Wilson joined the company as executives. As well as joyriding flights the fleet now included two more twin-engined Avro Ansons to operate newspaper and freight flights including for one season a regular service between Liverpool and London.

The Wilson family were successful businessmen in Liverpool owning Limocoat Ltd and later the Famous Army Stores. They were also involved with the Cathedral Touring Agency (CTA), a travel company, which provided most all-inclusive, tour business for the airline. In 1951, F.H. Wilson was appointed chairman of the board and by 1954 the family had acquired full control of the company.

In the early fifties, the airline expanded, acquiring a number of Douglas DC-3s, including two prewar-built examples. This expansion was to operate seasonal tourist charters and build-up a network of summer scheduled services from Liverpool including flights to continental European destinations including Lourdes and Biarritz.

In 1957 the airline purchased the larger four-engined Douglas DC-4 with four further examples being acquired between March 1960 and January 1963. The first DC-4 charter was flown on 8 January 1958 between Liverpool and Southend Airport with football supporters. The Skymasters and DC-3s were also used on scheduled services from Liverpool to London Heathrow and from Liverpool and Manchester to Newquay in Cornwall.

In February 1961 the airline introduced the turbo-prop Vickers Viscount aircraft for use on inclusive tour flights and schedules to London Heathrow. The refined livery of the first aircraft G-ARIR, particularly the roundel near the nose, hinted at its previous owner, Air France.

In November 1963, Starways negotiated a co-operative agreement with British Eagle. The final Starways flight landed at Liverpool on 31 December 1963, thereafter British Eagle took over all routes. Due to delays in the transfer of route registration, British Eagle were obliged to operate routes in the name of Starways requiring two of their own red, liveried Viscount aircraft to be branded Starways.

However, ownership of the fleet, aircraft hangars, parts inventory and other assets remained with the Starways Directors who continued in business as Aviation Overhauls. This new company provided a variety of maintenance and support services until in 1969, all aircraft had been sold and the company closed.

Aircraft operated 

 1 x Auster 5 - 1950–1950
 2 x Avro Anson 625A 1 1949–1952
 2 x Avro 19 series 2 - 1950–1951
 1 x De Havilland Dragon Rapide - 1951–1953
 7 x Douglas DC-3 - 1950-1955
 7 x Douglas DC-4 - 1957-1964
 1 x Miles M65 Gemini 1A - 1950-1952
 1 x M.11A Whitney Straight 1951-1954
 1 x Percival P16 Q6 Petrel 1949-1949 
 2 x Vickers Viscount 700 1961-1964

Accidents and Incidents
 early May 1949: Starways first aircraft, a Percival Petrel, destroyed in an accident at Broom Hall Airfield, Pwllheli
 28 March 1956: a Starways Douglas DC-3 G-AMRB was on a positioning flight from Liverpool to Glasgow in readiness for a charter the next day to Lourdes. While on approach to Glasgow Renfrew Airport, the aircraft struck a hill at Largs, cause reported as pilot error. No passengers were carried and one of the three crew died.
 17 September 1961: a Starways Douglas DC-4 G-APIN destroyed while being used by the United Nations (ONU) at Kamina during the Congo Crisis. The plane was used as a troop carrier; it was parked on the ground at Kamina Airport when Katangan fighter-aircraft attacked.
 19 September 1961: a Starways Douglas DC-4 G-ARJY, crashed after overshooting the runway at Dublin airport; crash site recorded by Pathé News. On board were 4 crew and 64 passengers travelling to Dublin from Tarbes. On approach, the plane suddenly veered to the left, skidding along the ground to end up straddling the main road to Belfast. No one was hurt, but the aircraft was so badly damaged it was written off. Pathé News filmed the accident investigators attending the scene. Heavy rain on the night was blamed for the accident. The lack of casualties was attributed to the quantity of Holy Water being carried by pilgrims returning from Lourdes.

References

 

Defunct airlines of the United Kingdom
Airlines established in 1948
Airlines disestablished in 1963